Mahmudul Hasan is a Jatiya Party (Ershad) politician and the former Member of Parliament of Dhaka-9.

Career
Hasan was elected to parliament from Dhaka-9 as a Jatiya Party candidate in 1986.

References

Jatiya Party politicians
Living people
3rd Jatiya Sangsad members
Year of birth missing (living people)